Cleonice Serôa da Motta Berardinelli (28 August 1916 – 31 January 2023) was a Brazilian academic. 

Berardinelli was born in Rio de Janeiro on 28 August 1916, to Emídio Serôa da Motta and Rosina Coutinho Serôa da Motta. Her father was in the Army and was frequently transferred around the country. As a result, Cleonice lived in many parts of Brazil, including Rio de Janeiro and Sao Paulo. In Rio, she studied at the National Institute of Music under the guidance of Oscar Lorenzo Fernandez, who was also her piano teacher. She interrupted her studies to move to Sao Paulo, where she finished her secondary school. She attended the University of Sao Paulo, where she studied literature under Fidelino de Figueiredo, among others. She graduated in 1938.

Berardinelli completed a PhD at the University of Brazil (1959); her doctoral thesis on Fernando Pessoa was the first such thesis on the Portuguese poet to be written in Brazil. She became a full professor at the Federal University of Rio de Janeiro in 1944, and was made professor emerita in 1987. She was also a full professor at the Pontifical Catholic University of Rio de Janeiro in 1963, and made emerita there in 2006. In addition, she taught at the Catholic University of Petrópolis, the Rio Branco Institute, and the University of California Santa Barbara.

Berardinelli was the sixth occupant of chair number eight at the Brazilian Academy of Letters, to which she was elected on 16 December 2009, in succession of Antônio Olinto. She was received on 5 April 2010, by academician Affonso Arinos de Mello Franco (Afonso Filho).

Berardinelli died in Rio de Janeiro on 31 January 2023, at age 106.

References

1916 births
2023 deaths
Brazilian centenarians
Academic staff of the Federal University of Rio de Janeiro
Women centenarians
People from Rio de Janeiro (city)
Academic staff of the Pontifical Catholic University of Rio de Janeiro
University of California, Santa Barbara faculty
University of São Paulo alumni
Federal University of Rio de Janeiro alumni
Brazilian women academics
Members of the Brazilian Academy of Letters
Grand Crosses of the Order of Prince Henry
Commanders of the Order of Prince Henry
Grand Crosses of the Order of Saint James of the Sword
Commanders of the Order of Saint James of the Sword